Gotcha! is an unreleased party video game that was in development by The Dome Software Developments and originally planned to be published by Atari Corporation on a scheduled 1996 release date for the Jaguar. It was also intended to be released for the IBM PC compatibles.

In the game, players fight against each other with close-quarter or weapon attacks in an attempt of turning on all of their respective colored light bulbs to be the victor, while also managing to avoiding the dangers and havoc by the gimmicks that change the dynamic course of the matches each stage bring upon. First announced in mid-1995, the project was part of an effort by Atari Corp.'s UK division to incite independent developers to work with the Jaguar on original titles.

Gameplay 

Gotcha! is primarily a side-scrolling action-platform party game with fighting and run and gun elements similar to The Outfoxies and Soldat where the main basic objective of players is to turn on all of their respective colored light bulbs before AI-controlled opponents manage to do the same by performing close-quarter attacks or picking up weapons and items scattered across the stage to harm them. Multiplayer is a heavy focus of the game, as up to four players with the Team Tap adapter can compete against each other on a split screen to turn all their light bulbs. The game features several stages to choose from, which are large and contain multiple platforms and obstacles players can run and jump to move around, while their environments also employ thematic events and scenarios which can damage players and dynamically change the playing field over the course of the matches.

Development 
Gotcha! was being developed by The Dome Software Developments, who previously worked on conversions such as Shaq Fu for Amiga and Cannon Fodder for Jaguar. The project formed part of Atari's European center of development, which was established in January 1995 with the aim of working alongside small game developers around the region to create original titles for the Jaguar. The game was first announced in a July 1995 issue by online magazine Atari Explorer Online and was touted for a general 1996 release, while it remained to be listed as an upcoming title for the console across several issues of the magazine.

On October of the same year, it was previewed on a supplementary issue by video game magazine Ultimate Future Games that featured the only known screenshot of the title as of date showcasing the multiplayer component, while it and internal documents from Atari listed it for a late 1995 released date instead. By this period, Dome Software were also branching out to develop on other platforms such as the PlayStation and Sega Saturn, among others. However, in January 1996, Atari Explorer Online editor Iain Laskey reported that the project was moved on to PC instead, as it was deemed to be not suitable for the Jaguar and would eventually be left unreleased for unknown reasons. On November 16, 2016, Creative Assembly director Jonathan Court revealed on a Jaguar-dedicated Facebook group that he worked on the project and also claimed that work done on the project may still be under his ownership.

References 

1995 video games
Action video games
Atari games
Cancelled Atari Jaguar games
Cancelled PC games
Fighting games
Multiplayer and single-player video games
Party video games
Platform games
Run and gun games
Side-scrolling video games
Video games developed in the United Kingdom